The city of Bristol, England, is divided into many areas, which often overlap or have non-fixed borders. These include Parliamentary constituencies, council wards and unofficial neighbourhoods. There are no civil parishes in Bristol.

Parliamentary constituencies
Bristol is divided into four constituencies for the purpose of Parliamentary representation. These are:
Bristol West
Bristol East
Bristol South
Bristol North West

Council wards

The city is split into 34 wards for local government. Like the parliamentary constituencies, their borders are rigidly defined.

Ashley
Avonmouth
Bedminster
Bishopston
Bishopsworth
Brislington East
Brislington West
 Central
Clifton
 Clifton Down
Cotham
Easton
Eastville
Filwood
Frome Vale
 Hartcliffe and Withywood
 Henbury and Brentry
 Hengrove and Whitchurch Park
Hillfields
Horfield
Hotwells and Harbourside
Knowle
Lawrence Hill
Lockleaze
Redland
Southmead
Southville
 St George Central
 St George Troopers Hill
St George West
Stockwood
Stoke Bishop
 Westbury-on-Trym and Henleaze
Windmill Hill

Neighbourhoods
The neighbourhoods of Bristol do not have fixed boundaries as they are mainly informal areas. Some of these areas overlap, or are contained within others, while others have more than one name.

The following areas and towns make up the city of Bristol and its outskirts. It includes some adjoining areas of South Gloucestershire, marked SG, and North Somerset, marked NS.

Bristol city centre
Arnos Vale
Ashley Down
Ashton Vale
Avonmouth
Aztec WestSG
Baptist Mills
Barrs CourtSG
Barton Hill
Bedminster
Bedminster Down
Begbrook
Bishopston
Bishopsworth
Blaise Hamlet
Botany Bay
Bower Ashton
Bradley StokeSG
Brandon Hill
Brentry
Brislington
Broadmead
Broomhill
Broom Hill
Canons Marsh
CatbrainSG
Chester Park
CheswickSG
Clay Hill
Clifton
Coombe Dingle
Cotham
Crew's Hole
Crofts End
DownendSG
Eastville
Easton
Emersons GreenSG
FiltonSG
Filwood Park
Fishponds
FrenchaySG
Golden Hill
Greenbank
HambrookSG
HanhamSG
Hartcliffe
Headley Park
Henbury
Hengrove
Henleaze
Hillfields
Horfield
Hotwells
Kensington Park
Kingsdown
KingswoodSG
Knowle
Knowle West
Lawrence Hill
Lawrence Weston
Leigh WoodsNS
Lewin's Mead
Lockleaze
Lodge Hill
Longwell GreenSG
MangotsfieldSG
Mayfield Park
Monks Park
Montpelier
Moorfields
Netham
 Newtown
North CommonSG
Oldland CommonSG
PatchwaySG
Redcliffe
Redfield
Redland
Ridgeway
Sea Mills
Shirehampton
Sneyd Park
Southmead
Southville
Speedwell
Spike Island
 St Agnes
St Andrews
St Anne's
St George
St Jude's
St Paul's
St Philip's Marsh
St Werburgh's
Staple HillSG
Stapleton
Stockwood
Stoke Bishop
Stokes Croft
Totterdown
Two Mile Hill
Tyndalls Park
Upper Knowle
Victoria Park
WarmleySG
Westbury on Trym
Westbury Park
Whitchurch
Whitehall
WillsbridgeSG
Windmill Hill
WinterbourneSG
Withywood

See also
 Politics of Bristol

References

Bristol
 
Bristol
Places